An Evening with Silk Sonic is the debut studio album by American musical superduo Silk Sonic, composed of Bruno Mars and Anderson .Paak. It was released on November 12, 2021, by Aftermath Entertainment and Atlantic Records. Silk Sonic reunited with Christopher Brody Brown and James Fauntleroy to write the album. They recruited American musician Bootsy Collins, who came up with the name for Mars and Paak's duo, for narration and American record producer D'Mile to compose the album. Recording sessions for An Evening with Silk Sonic took place in 2017 and between early 2020 to mid-2021 at Shampoo Press & Curl Studios.

Several critics said An Evening with Silk Sonic was crafted from elements of R&B, soul, funk, hip hop and pop music. The lyrics of An Evening with Silk Sonic explore themes featured in previous Mars's albums, such as "seduction, romance", reconciliation, and materialism. Anderson .Paak is said to not have written about materialism previously.

An Evening with Silk Sonic debuted at number two on the Billboard 200 chart with first-week sales of 104,000 equivalent album units and became Mars's second and .Paak's first number-one album on the US Top R&B/Hip-Hop Albums. It also peaked in the top-five in Australia, Canada, Ireland and New Zealand, and produced five singles: "Leave the Door Open" and "Smokin out the Window", which were commercially successful, while "Skate" charted moderately in various countries. Two other singles "Love's Train", a cover of Con Funk Shun's song, and "After Last Night" were made available for consumption in 2022, with each one of them having minor commercial success. "Leave the Door Open"  reached number one on the Billboard Hot 100 and New Zealand, becoming Mars's eighth and .Paak's first number-one song in the United States. The album was certified gold by Music Canada (MC) and platinum by the Recording Industry Association of America (RIAA).

An Evening with Silk Sonic received universal acclaim, and is the most acclaimed studio album of Mars' career, with reviewers praising its retro sensibility and the chemistry between Mars and .Paak. At the 64th Grammy Awards in 2022, "Leave The Door Open" won four Grammy Awards, including Record of the Year, Song of the Year, Best R&B Performance and Best R&B song. Several publications listed the album as one of the best records of the year and Billboard named it as the seventh-best album of 2021. The album was also promoted via An Evening with Silk Sonic at Park MGM (2022), along with a number of performances at various award shows.

Background
American singers Bruno Mars and Anderson .Paak met in 2017 while touring together on the European leg of Mars's 24K Magic World Tour (2017–18). The two were seen in the studio working with Nile Rodgers and Guy Lawrence of Disclosure. They quickly became friends and decided to collaborate on a project together. In an interview with New Zealand radio DJ Zane Lowe for the Apple Music radio station Apple Music 1, Mars said that most of the album is "rooted in [.Paak's] drum beats". He continued, saying that he works "backward from the guitar or piano", whereas .Paak's "music is percussion-driven, derived from old-school Motown influence." They credit each other for the sound that models Silk Sonic. According to American record producer and songwriter D'Mile, Silk Sonic became a project after Mars, .Paak and he worked on a song.

On February 26, 2021, Mars and .Paak announced they had recorded an album together under the band name Silk Sonic. At the time, the band's debut album was set to be titled An Evening with Silk Sonic, featuring American musician Bootsy Collins as a special guest host. At the same time, the artwork was revealed and is a retro sketch of the two hitmakers' floating heads that reads, "An evening with Silk Sonic ... with special guest host Bootsy Collins". They also announced the release of the first single the following week, along with the album title.

.Paak says Mars considers every detail of a song, such as its theme, its sounds, and how they would engage people with the chorus, while .Paak is more of a free form, perceptive and "What's the vibe?" musician. The latter affirmed they were inspired by the 1960s, 1970s, and "the old school". According to Mars, they reunited in the studio during the night to drink and play music they enjoy. .Paak said the duo was influenced by Aretha Franklin, James Brown, Miles Davis, Stevie Wonder and Prince. The duo "bonded over their love of classic soul" and would usually play each other songs they loved. .Paak was not sure the project would become a reality if the COVID-19 pandemic did not end, since they would have been playing shows at that time.

Silk Sonic explained that despite the police killings and the pandemic, they decided not to address said issues on their music. Mars furthered, "A good song can bring people together...so that was our mindset with the whole album. If it makes us feel good, and resonates with us, that's gonna be infectious and make other people feel good." .Paak said both have suffered a lot during their lives and that this album is their way to cope with it. Nevertheless, Silk Sonic recorded a track with "heavier" substance, but Mars was uncertain if he wanted to include the song on the album. When they finished the session, Mars played the recording for himself and decided to drive to .Paak's house. When the latter listened to the song on the car he decided to reject it, despite working on it for weeks. Mars explained that he has mixed every album he released since his debut, by listening to it in his Cadillac CTS to understand how it would play out in an ideal "real-world scenario".

Recording
In early 2017, after .Paak and Mars met on tour, they decided to get together in the studio with no intent, besides their mutual appreciation and affection. At this point, the duo decided to try if they could turn the "backstage in-jokes" into songs. The first thing they wrote together started with one of them saying the sentence "Smoking out the window". They created an amusing "stressed-out" man smoking too many cigarettes as he tries to find his way out of "anxious" situations. When they got together in the studio, the "joke" was turned into a hook. Once the tour ended, the sessions were put on hold.

Nevertheless, in February 2020, before the COVID-19 pandemic, Mars was listening to what they had recorded, and "it hit the right chord" so he called .Paak to join him in the studio. However, it was the latter's birthday and, despite being drunk, he met Mars at the studio. When they started to write a song, "a competitive" and a friendly spirit emerged as they were trying to improve on the work. They enjoyed so much working together, the duo decided to keep going. .Paak affirmed that, despite the COVID-19 pandemic, they decided to get together in the studio instead of "trying to make music long-distance". In the studio, the duo would jam out, trying to understand how to make people feel good with the songs they created from scratch and what was missing on the tracks, having to recreate a song from scrap at times. While in the studio, Mars and .Paak tried to create a dream setlist. They dubbed it as "the setlist of doom", however they needed someone who could "thread" all the songs. They both admired American musician and singer Bootsy Collins, who not only came up with the name for Mars and Paak's duo but also hosted the album. Mars declared, "Anderson coming into the studio and unlocking something in my brain that I've never used before ... That's how inspiration happens, you know?"

Mars reunited with frequent collaborators, American songwriter and producer Christopher Brody Brown, as well as Canadian recording engineer Charles Moniz to record An Evening with Silk Sonic. At this point, Mars asked American singer-songwriter James Fauntleroy to get in touch with D'Mile, after Mars found the latter on Instagram and heard his composition on Lucky Daye's debut studio album, Painted (2019). Once in the studio, D'Mile wanted to make a good impression by finishing the track that Mars had started and do nothing else until he completed it. However, Mars told him "we're here all the time. I would love for you to come rock with us." The former became one of the core composers of the album. The duo also worked with American rapper and record producer Dr. Dre, who gave feedback on the project. Homer Steinweiss, American drummer of the Dap-Kings, who had previously worked with Mars on Unorthodox Jukebox (2012) and 24K Magic (2016), also contributed to the album by playing drums on a song.

To achieve the sound they were aiming for, Sonic and Moniz had to reach out to elderly "session guys" and read "old drumming magazines". They needed the right gear, such as a Ludwig drums with Remo Ambassador heads, Giovanni Hidalgo congas, a Hohner Clavinet D6 keyboard, a Danelectro sitar, a Trophy Music mini-Glockenspiel and a Solid State Logic mixing board. Afterward, they were "emulating old-school playing styles and recording them", using one or two mics and several musicians playing at the same time in the same place. Despite having all the instruments to re-create the sound they were not able to do so at that time. According to .Paak, they were "fucking bashing!", while the ones that came before them were "tiptoeing".

Sonic disclosed their process when re-working a small transaction on a song. The latter pays tribute to Philadelphia soul featuring a "string section and a sampled rainstorm". Its lyrics detail a heartbreak and how to deal with it after. Mars, D'Mile, and .Paak heard each instrument isolated and realized that the drums were not adequate. The latter replayed the drum section for 20 minutes, as Mars and D'Mile gave their opinion. Once the drumline was established, Mars turned its attention to the piano section, which took ten minutes to find an arrangement everyone enjoyed. According to D'Mile, all the tracks they came up with are included on the album, but one. When they were unhappy with the version created, they remixed it so that everyone from Mars to the engineer's assistant, liked it.

Composition
An Evening with Silk Sonic has been described as an R&B, soul, funk, rap, and pop album.

Release and promotion

In late February 2021, Mars and .Paak announced on social media the formation of their new band, Silk Sonic, and revealed the artwork for their debut studio album, titled An Evening with Silk Sonic. They also announced the release of the first single on March 5, 2021. "Leave the Door Open" was released as the first single in various countries. On the same date, "Silk Sonic Intro" was also issued featuring the album's special guest Bootsy Collins. Silk Sonic performed "Leave the Door Open" live for the first time at the 63rd Annual Grammy Awards on March 14, 2021; their performance received critical acclaim from music critics. They also performed it live at the 2021 iHeartRadio Music Awards on May 27, 2021. Consequences Nina Corcoran called the performance "mesmerizing". Joe Lynch, from Billboard, praised Silk Sonic's performance as they, "worked the crowd exactly like the '70s soul singers that Silk Sonic pays homage to would have." A month later, the duo performed "Leave the Door Open" at the BET Awards 2021.

On July 30, 2021, "Skate" was issued as the second single also in several countries. Initially, Mars and .Paak stated the album would be released in the fall of 2021. However, its release was delayed to January 2022, as they wanted to issue more songs. Despite their previous scheduling, on October 8, 2021, coinciding with Mars's birthday, Silk Sonic announced the album's release date of November 12, 2021. On the same date, the record was made available for pre-saves and for pre-order worldwide via Mars's official site with four buying options. On October 29, 2021, the digital marketing agency, Get Engaged, affirmed they were working on campaigns to promote the album. On November 10, 2021, two days before the release of the album, in an event hosted by Spotify, Silk Sonic premiered several songs at West Hollywood's Peppermint Club for a selected group of people. On November 21, 2021, the duo performed "Smokin out the Window" at the American Music Awards of 2021. One week later, Silk Sonic sung "Fly as Me" and "Smokin Out the Window" at the 2021 Soul Train Music Awards. The song "777" appeared in a commercial for AirPods shortly after the release of the album.

On February 14, 2022, the duo released a cover of Con Funk Shun's "Love's Train" (1982) as a commemorative song for Valentine's day. Silk Sonic embarked on their concert residency, An Evening with Silk Sonic at Park MGM, which started on February 25, 2022, held at the Park Theater, Park MGM in Las Vegas. At the 64th Annual Grammy Awards in 2022, the duo performed "777" as the opening act. The duo performed their cover version of "Love's Train" at the 2022 Billboard Music Awards.

Singles
"Leave the Door Open" was released as the album's lead single on March 5, 2021, along with its music video. The song was generally well received; reviewers complimented both singers' vocals, as well as the song's composition. It was listed by several publications, including Billboard and Complex, as being among the best songs of the year. The recording was a success, topping the charts in the United States, Israel, and New Zealand, and reached the top ten in several other countries, including Australia, Belgium (Flanders and Wallonia), Canada, and Portugal.

"Skate" was released as the album's second single on July 30, 2021, along with its music video. The single received critical acclaim from music critics, who noted the track's "summer vibes", in addition to the "funky" influences of the 1970s. It charted moderately, reaching number 14 on the Billboard Hot 100, number 12 in New Zealand, and topping the Israel charts.

"Smokin out the Window"  was released as the album's third single on November 5, 2021, alongside its music video. The song reached the top five in the United States and New Zealand, as well as top twenty in several other countries, including Australia, Canada, Denmark and the United Kingdom.

A cover version of Con Funk Shun's "Love's Train" was first released on February 14, 2022, to digital stores and streaming services. It was later confirmed as the record's fourth single by Billboard with a radio release date of March 18, 2022, in Italy. The single received critical acclaim from music critics, who praised Mars and .Paak's vocals and their commitment to the original version of the song. It spent 13 weeks on the top spot of the Billboard Adult R&B Songs chart.

"After Last Night" was only released as a single to American urban adult contemporary radio stations, on July 5, 2022. Its charting was influenced by the release of its parent album An Evening with Silk Sonic. It topped the Billboard Adult R&B Songs chart.

Critical reception 

An Evening with Silk Sonic received acclaim from music critics upon release. At Metacritic, which assigns a normalized rating out of 100 to reviews from professional publications, the album received an average score of 83, based on 15 reviews, indicating "universal acclaim". Aggregator AnyDecentMusic? gave An Evening with Silk Sonic 8.0 out of 10, based on their assessment of the critical consensus.

Music critics appreciated Mars' and .Paak's chemistry and songwriting. Andy Kellman of AllMusic praised "the duo's playfulness", as "they push each other into new levels of showmanship without pandering to the audience." Talking about the album's themes, Tani Levitt of Clash described it as "an album about friendship and swagger masquerading as a love album." Sophie Williams of NME lauded Silk Sonic for their attention to detail and wrote that the songs are "rich and colourful", complementing the "all-out pop hooks, lush harmonies and conversational verses." Jon Dolan of Rolling Stone called the album "a lavish love letter to Seventies soul music" and dubbed it the most enjoyable album in Mars's repertoire. Music journalist Jon Pareles of The New York Times said that Mars and .Paak "flaunt skill, effort and scholarship" in the album, which he called a "lavish, impeccable bauble, a purely ornamental not-quite-period piece." Wongo Okon of Uproxx called the album "fun, charismatic, and ambitious in all the best ways," adding that it will "undoubtedly be one of 2021's most memorable albums." Mary Siroky of Consequence called the album "delicious, indulgent, and dripping with Motown, funk, and soul". In a mixed review, No Ripcord writer Joe Rivers rated the album 6 out of 10 and wrote An Evening with Silk Sonic suffers from "a paucity of ideas" with tracks that recycle the same sounds and subject matter.

Year-end lists
An Evening with Silk Sonic  appeared on many year-end best-of lists, with several critics identifying it as one of the best albums of 2021. The following is a selected list of publications.

Accolades 
In 2022, An Evening with Silk Sonic was nominated for Outstanding Album at the 53rd NAACP Image Awards. The album won R&B Album of the Year at the 2022 iHeartRadio Music Awards. It was also nominated for Top R&B Album at the 2022 Billboard Music Awards. It was named Modern Pop-Rock Album/Voice Recording of the Year at the 2022 Fonogram Awards. In the same year, "Leave The Door Open" was nominated for four Grammy Awards at the 64th Grammy Awards, including Record of the Year and Song of the Year. Mars and .Paak won the four Grammy Awards for the song, adding Best R&B Performance (tied with "Pick Up Your Feelings" (2020) by Jazmine Sullivan) and Best R&B song. The album would later be nominated for and would go on to win the Album of the Year at the BET Awards 2022.

The album was nominated for Favorite R&B Album at the American Music Awards of 2022. However, the duo declined to submit it for the 65th Annual Grammy Awards, citing the amount of accolades they had already garnered. Previously, the album had been assumed to be a top contender for Album of the Year.

Commercial performance
An Evening with Silk Sonic debuted at number two on the Billboard 200 with first-week sales of 104,000 equivalent album units, which consists of 42,000 album sales, 60,000 streaming units calculated from the 82.6 million on-demand streams of the album's tracks, and 2,000 in track equivalent album units. In its second week, the album remained in the top ten and fell to number four, earning 50,000 album-equivalent units. By the end of 2021, the album had surpassed a billion streams.

An Evening With Silk Sonic sold 37,000 copies on vinyl becoming the largest sales week for an R&B album on vinyl, a record previously held by The Weeknd's Dawn FM (2022) with 34,000 copies.

Seven of the nine songs from the album charted on the Billboard Hot 100 the same week. "Leave the Door Open", "Smokin out the Window", "Love's Train" and "After Last Night" topped the Adult R&B Airplay. This achievement led An Evening with Silk Sonic to become the second album with four number-one singles on the former chart, tying with Toni Braxton's self-titled (1993) studio album.

Track listing 

Notes
 On the alternative version of the album, "Love's Train" is the ninth track of the album while "Blast Off" is placed as the tenth song.

Personnel
Credits adapted from album's liner notes.

Silk Sonic
 Bruno Mars – vocals , guitar , congas , percussion , guitar solo , sitar 
 Anderson .Paak – vocals , drums 

Additional musicians
 Babyface – background vocals 
 Brody Brown – bass 
 Natasha Colkett – violin 
 Bootsy Collins – vocals 
 Gared Crawford – violin 
 D'Mile – background vocals , bass , piano , guitar , keyboards , B3 , percussion , organ , Rhodes , programming 
 Blake Espy – violin 
 Ella Feingold – additional guitars , guitar effects , vibraphone 
 Glenn Fischbach – cello 
 David Foreman – rhythm guitar 
 Marc Franklin – trumpet 
 Larry Gold – string arrangements and conducting 
 Steve Heitliner – viola 
 Chris Jussell – violin 

 Ron Kerber – flute 
 Jonathan Kim – viola 
 James King – vocals 
 Emma Kummrow – violin 
 Luigi Mazzocchi – violin 
 Lannie McMillan – tenor saxophone 
 Krystal Miles – background vocals 
 Boo Mitchell – horns 
 Yoshihiko Nakano – viola 
 Jeremy Reeves – percussion 
 Kirk Smothers – alto saxophone , baritone saxophone 
 Homer Steinweiss – drums 
 Steve Tirpak – string co-arrangements 
 Thundercat – vocals, bass 
 Tess Varley – violin 
 Kameron Whalum – trombone , vocals 

Technical
 Randy Merrill – mastering
 Serban Ghenea – mixing
 John Hanes – mix engineering
 Charles Moniz – engineering, recording, percussion 
 Alex Resoagli – engineering assistance, cabasa 
 Bryce Bordone – mixing assistance
 Jeff Chestek – strings recording 
 Cody Cichowski – strings recording , strings recording assistance 
 Tobe Donohue – Bootsy Collins vocal recording 
 Jens Jungkurth – drum engineering 

Artwork and design
 Florent Déchard – album art, photography
 John Esparza – album art, photography
 Harper Collins – photography

Charts

Weekly charts

Year-end charts

Certifications

Release history

See also
 List of Billboard number-one R&B/hip-hop albums of 2021
 List of UK R&B Albums Chart number ones of 2021

References

2021 debut albums
Silk Sonic albums
Anderson .Paak albums 
Bruno Mars albums
Aftermath Entertainment albums
Albums produced by Bruno Mars
Albums produced by D'Mile
Atlantic Records albums